Zheng Shuang (born on 18 November 1966 in Shenyang, Liaoning) is a Chinese film actress. She received classical training as a Daoma Dan (刀馬旦) in Beijing opera.

Selected filmography
Deadful Melody 1994 Hong Kong fantasy film
Wu Zetian 1995 TV series
The Water Margin 1998 TV seriesDemi-Gods and Semi-Devils 2003 TV seriesHuang Taizi Mishi 2004 TV series Genghis Khan 2004 TV seriesWu Cheng'en and Journey to the West'' 2010 TV series

References

1966 births
Living people
20th-century Chinese actresses
21st-century Chinese actresses
Chinese film actresses
Chinese television actresses